

Apimostinel (GATE-202, formerly NRX-1074) is an investigational antidepressant, acting as a novel and selective modulator of the NMDA receptor. It is currently under development for the acute treatment of major depressive disorder (MDD) by Gate Neurosciences, and previously by Naurex and Allergan. As of February 2015, an intravenous formulation of apimostinel has completed a phase IIa clinical trial for MDD.

Similar to rapastinel (GLYX-13), its mechanism of action acts through a unique binding site on the NMDA receptor, independent of the glycine site, to modulate receptor activity and enhance NMDAR-mediated synaptic plasticity. However, apimostinel is 1000-fold more potent in vitro and is intended as an improved, follow-up drug to rapastinel. Similar to rapastinel, apimostinel is an amidated tetrapeptide, but has been structurally modified, via the addition of a benzyl group, to enhance its metabolic stability and pharmacokinetic profile. The drug has shown rapid and potent antidepressant effects in pre-clinical models of depression. In addition, similarly to rapastinel, it is well tolerated and lacks the schizophrenia-like psychotomimetic effects of NMDA receptor antagonists such as ketamine.

See also 
 List of investigational antidepressants
 Rapastinel
 Zelquistinel

References

External links 
 Apimostinel (NRX-1074) - AdisInsight

Antidepressants
Benzyl compounds
Carboxamides
Experimental drugs
NMDA receptor agonists
Tetrapeptides
Pyrrolidines